San Francisco Gold Rush may refer to:

 San Francisco 49ers Gold Rush, a cheerleading squad
 California Gold Rush, 1848–1855